Love Hina is a Japanese manga series written and illustrated by Ken Akamatsu, serialized in the Weekly Shōnen Magazine from October 1998 to October 2001. A twenty-four episode anime adaptation was produced by studio Xebec and aired in Japan from April to September 2000, with three follow-up original video animation (OVA) episodes released between 2000 and 2002.

Prior to the start of the anime, several image songs were recorded by the anime cast members. Several maxi singles were released featuring some of these image songs as well as drama tracks, also performed by the anime cast. "I Love Hina" was released on April 26, 2000 and followed by Love Hina 1 on June 26, 2000, Love Hina 2 on July 26, 2000 and Love Hina 3 on August 23, 2000. Love Hina 1 came with a box to hold the other singles.

After the airing of the anime, several Love Hina soundtracks were released. The following is a list of these soundtracks and their contents:

Soundtracks

Supplementary Soundtracks

Original Sound File
 was released by King Records on September 21, 2000. The catalog number for the soundtrack is KICA-523/4. The album spent two weeks on the Oricon charts, reaching position 34. The Liner notes contain lyrics for the vocal tracks and a list of all the vocal songs recorded for the series and the dates they were recorded.
The catalog number was KICA-533, and the album reached number 39 on the Oricon chart and stayed on the chart for 2 weeks.

Hinata Girls Song Best 2
{{nihongo|Love Hina - Hinata Girls Song Best 2|ひなたガールズベストソングベスト2}} was released by King Records on October 3, 2001. The catalog number was KICA-557 and the album reached number 40 on the Oricon chart.

Other soundtracks, singles, etc.

These soundtracks are also implemented from the anime Love Hina'', although these albums will be available through digital distribution.

Love Hina Again - Kirari Takaramono Single

Love Hina Mini Album 1 (Naru, Shinobu, Mitsune)

Love Hina Mini Album 2 (Naru, Motoko, Suu)

Love Hina Mini Album 3 (Naru, Mutsumi, Sarah)

Love Hina Okazaki Collection MP3

Love Hina Sakura Saku

Love Hina Single - Kaitou Gentei CD Friendship

Love Hina Spring Special Original Soundtrack

References

Love Hina
Love HIna
Lists of soundtracks